In the theory of Lie groups, the exponential map is a map from the Lie algebra  of a Lie group  into . In case  is a matrix Lie group, the exponential map reduces to the matrix exponential. The exponential map, denoted , is analytic and has as such a derivative , where  is a  path in the Lie algebra, and a closely related differential .

It was later elaborated by Henri Poincaré (1899) in the context of the problem of expressing Lie group multiplication using Lie algebraic terms. It is also sometimes known as Duhamel's formula.

The formula is important both in pure and applied mathematics. It enters into proofs of theorems such as the Baker–Campbell–Hausdorff formula, and it is used frequently in physics  for example in quantum field theory, as in the Magnus expansion in perturbation theory, and in lattice gauge theory.

Throughout, the notations  and  will be used interchangeably to denote the exponential given an argument, except when, where as noted, the notations have dedicated distinct meanings. The calculus-style notation is preferred here for better readability in equations. On the other hand, the -style is sometimes more convenient for inline equations, and is necessary on the rare occasions when there is a real distinction to be made.

Statement
The derivative of the exponential map is given by

Explanation

 
is employed. With  the result

Proof
The proof given below assumes a matrix Lie group. This means that the exponential mapping from the Lie algebra to the matrix Lie group is given by the usual power series, i.e. matrix exponentiation. See comments on the general case below.

The solution is then .

Lemma

Let  denote the adjoint action of the group on its Lie algebra.

Proof

Using the product rule twice one finds,

Then one observes that

Integration yields

Using the formal power series to expand the exponential, integrating term by term, and finally recognizing,

and the result follows.

Comments on the general case
The formula in the general case is given by

where

which formally reduces to

Here the -notation is used for the exponential mapping of the Lie algebra and the calculus-style notation in the fraction indicates the usual formal series expansion. For more information and two full proofs in the general case, see the freely available  reference.

A direct formal argument
An immediate way to see  what the answer must be, provided it exists is the following. Existence needs to be proved separately in each case. By direct differentiation of the standard limit definition of the exponential, and exchanging the order of differentiation and limit,

Dividing the unit interval into  sections  ( since the sum indices are integers) and letting  → ∞,  yields

Applications

Local behavior of the exponential map
Any  map  between vector spaces (here first considering matrix Lie groups) has a  inverse such that  is a  bijection in an open set around a point  in the domain provided  is invertible. From it follows that this will happen precisely when

is invertible. This, in turn, happens when the eigenvalues of this operator are all nonzero.

Putting  one sees that  is invertible precisely when

Let the eigenvalues of  be . Fix an ordered basis  of the underlying vector space  such that  is lower triangular. Then 

Let  be the corresponding basis for matrix space, i.e. . Order this basis such that  if .

This means that  is lower triangular with its eigenvalues  on the diagonal.

The same conclusion holds for general Lie groups using the manifold version of the inverse function theorem.

It also follows from the implicit function theorem that  itself is invertible for  sufficiently small.

Derivation of a Baker–Campbell–Hausdorff formula 

If  is defined such that 

Its left-hand side is easy to see to equal Y. Thus,

and hence, formally,

and hence 

Putting this into the form of an integral in t from 0 to 1 yields,

Derivation of Dynkin's series formula 

Dynkin's formula mentioned may also be derived analogously, starting from the parametric extension

whence 

so that, using the above general formula,

Since, however, 

the last step by virtue of the Mercator series expansion, it follows that

and, thus, integrating,

For each , terms for each partition thereof are organized inside the integral . The resulting Dynkin's formula is then
      
For a similar proof with detailed series expansions, see .

Combinatoric details

in a power series. To handle the series expansions simply, consider first . The -series and the -series are given by

respectively. Combining these one obtains

This becomes

Equation  then gives

or, with a switch of notation, see An explicit Baker–Campbell–Hausdorff formula,

Now integrate , using ,

Write this as 

This amounts to

where  using the simple observation that  for all . In case ,  must equal , else the term vanishes for the same reason ( is not allowed). Finally, shift the index,

This is Dynkin's formula. The striking similarity with (99) is not accidental: It reflects the Dynkin–Specht–Wever map, underpinning the original, different, derivation of the formula. Namely, if

is expressible as a bracket series, then necessarily

Putting observation  and theorem together yields a concise proof of the explicit BCH formula.

See also
Adjoint representation (ad)
Baker-Campbell-Hausdorff formula
Exponential map
Matrix exponential
Matrix logarithm
Magnus expansion

Remarks

Notes

References
 ;  translation from        Google books.

Veltman, M, 't Hooft, G & de Wit, B (2007). "Lie Groups in Physics", online lectures.

External links

Mathematical physics
Matrix theory
Lie groups
Exponentials